Zwenshambe is a village in the  North-East District of Botswana. It is situated between Gungwe village in the west, Nlapkhwane village in the east, Mulambakwena village in the south and the Zimbabwe border in the north. It is not far from the Ramokgwebana Border Post. The nearest city to Zwenshambe is Francistown which is also the second largest city in Botswana.

Language 
People from Zwenshambe speak Kalanga language.

Schools 
There is a primary school, a community Junior Secondary school and a Brigade in Zwenshambe. The Zwenshambe Community Junior Secondary School was completed in 1983 but started operating in 1985.

Demographics 
The population in 2001 was 1,468. The population in 2011 was 1,943.

References

North-East District (Botswana)
Villages in Botswana